Today with Kris Aquino is a Philippine talk show hosted by actress Kris Aquino which premiered on November 18, 1996, and concluded on March 9, 2001, on ABS-CBN. It is claimed by some as the Filipino version of The Oprah Winfrey Show. It was where Aquino got her title as the "Philippines' Queen of Talk." The theme song was sung by Zsa Zsa Padilla.

History
Today with Kris Aquino was premiered as an afternoon talk show after Aquino left from GMA Network in 1996. On February 24, 1997, it transferred its timeslot from afternoon (4:00pm) to morning (11:00am), replacing the defunct talk show Teysi ng Tahanan. It also expanded its running time from 30 minutes to 1 hour with its reformat as a morning talk show.

On March 9, 2001, the show ended due to Noli de Castro's decision to run for the senate and leave TV Patrol. Korina Sanchez, who was then hosting Balitang K, was appointed to anchor TV Patrol. With these changes, Aquino was appointed to replace Sanchez, reformatting the show to Balitang Kris. Today with Kris Aquino was replaced by Talk TV.

In May 2011, Aquino announced that the show would be back on air again in June 2011, a decade after it ended. A few days, Aquino said the show would not be revived and instead she would start a talk show with a new title, Kris TV.

See also
 List of programs aired by ABS-CBN
 Kris
 Morning Girls with Kris and Korina
 Boy & Kris
 Kris TV

References

ABS-CBN original programming
1996 Philippine television series debuts
2001 Philippine television series endings
Philippine television talk shows
Filipino-language television shows